Perlejewo  is a village in Siemiatycze County, Podlaskie Voivodeship, in north-eastern Poland. It is the seat of the gmina (administrative district) called Gmina Perlejewo.

References

Perlejewo